Hyalochlorella marina, the only species in the genus Hyalochlorella and also known as Dermocystidium sp., is a marine heterotrophic eukaryote with uncertain phylogenic position.

Phylogeny 
Hyalochlorella marina was first classified as a fungus under the name Dermocystidium sp. Based morphology and development, it is more likely a colorless Chlorophyta related to Chlorella but different from the parasite microalgae Prototheca.

Ecology 
It is an epiphyte of marine seaweeds but has also been isolated from seawater. Hyalochlorella is found on several shores of east and west coast of the United States, Canada, the United Kingdom,  and off the Faroe Islands.

References 

Taxa described in 1970
Controversial taxa
Oocystaceae
Monotypic algae genera